Randøy is an island in Hjelmeland municipality in Rogaland county, Norway. The  island lies just off the mainland between the Jøsenfjorden and the Årdalsfjorden.  The large island of Ombo lies to the north and the island of Halsnøya lies to the west.  

The island is relatively flat in the south and it is more mountainous and forested in the central and northern regions. The island is known for its rich flora. An important industry on the island is fish farming.

The island is connected to the mainland by the Randøy Bridge. There are regular ferry connections from the island to Fister, Hjelmelandsvågen, and the island of Ombo.

See also
List of islands of Norway

References

Islands of Rogaland
Hjelmeland